Maslianico is a comune (municipality) in the Province of Como in the Italian region Lombardy, located about  north of Milan and about  northwest of Como, on the border with Switzerland.

Maslianico borders the following municipalities: Cernobbio, Como, Vacallo (Switzerland).

References

External links
Official website

Cities and towns in Lombardy